Fushun Special Steel Co., Ltd. (FSSS) is a Chinese steel maker based in Fushun, Liaoning Province. State enterprise Dongbei Special Steel was the largest shareholder of the company. The rest of the shares float in Shanghai Stock Exchange.

According to the officials of the company, the steel maker supplied steel to the manufacturing of aircraft carrier of China.

History
The steel refinery was found in 1937 by Japanese South Manchuria Railway Company in the occupied zone of wartime China. The steel refinery was belong to State-owned Assets Supervision and Administration Commission (SASAC) of the Government of Fushun City, as Fushun Special Steel (Group) Co., Ltd.. It was one of the 512 important state-owned enterprises in 1997. (1 of 47 iron and steel insudtry)

In 1999 the assets of the refinery was re-incorporated as Fushun Special Steel Co., Ltd.. In the next year the shares of the company were float in Shanghai Stock Exchange. Fushun Special Steel (Group) remained as the largest shareholder for 76.29% stake.

In 2003 the shares held by the parent company was partially transferred to another state-owned enterprise Dongbei Special Steel (for 56.62% stake), which Fushun Special Steel (Group) became the second largest shareholder of the listed company for 19.67%. At the same time Fushun Special Steel (Group) became the second largest shareholder of Dongbei Special Steel for 26.53% stake.

On 30 December 2010 Fushun Special Steel (Group) went bankrupted, which Dongbei Special Steel received the shares of the listed company from Fushun Special Steel (Group), making Dongbei Special Steel hold 57.07% stake at that time, while the shares of Dongbei Special Steel (22.68% stake) held by Fushun Special Steel (Group) was transferred to a subsidiary of SASAC of the Government of Liaoning Province in 2011.

Due to capital increase and disposals, the shares of the listed company held by Dongbei Special Steel was diluted to 38.58% at 31 December 2015.

See also
 Fushun Mining Group

References

External links
 

Steel companies of China
Companies based in Liaoning
Manufacturing companies established in 1937
Companies owned by the provincial government of China
Companies listed on the Shanghai Stock Exchange
Chinese companies established in 1937
Fushun